Rheocles vatosoa is a species of rainbowfish in the subfamily Bedotiinae, the Madagascar rainbowfishes. It is endemic to Madagascar.  Its natural habitat is the Lokoho River basin. It is threatened by habitat loss.

Sources

vatosoa
Freshwater fish of Madagascar
Fish described in 2002
Taxonomy articles created by Polbot